Christoph, Prince of Schleswig-Holstein (legal name in German: Christoph Prinz zu Schleswig-Holstein; born 22 August 1949), has been the head of the House of Schleswig-Holstein-Sonderburg-Glücksburg (commonly known as the House of Glücksburg) and, by agnatic primogeniture, of the entire House of Oldenburg since 1980.  He is the current titular eighth Duke of Schleswig-Holstein and Duke of Glücksburg, traditionally styled as His Highness. He is a male-line descendant of Christian I of Denmark, and is also descended cognatically from numerous more recent monarchs, including Queen Victoria of the United Kingdom, Emperor Alexander II of Russia and several more recent Danish kings.

House of Schleswig-Holstein-Sonderburg-Glücksburg 
The House of Oldenburg — in one of its cadet branches — is patrilineally the royal house of Denmark (since 1448), Norway (1450–1818 and since 1905), and the United Kingdom (since 2022), and has been the reigning dynasty of several other countries including Greece, Sweden and Russia. As such, Christoph is the agnatic head of the family that today includes Margrethe II of Denmark, Harald V of Norway, Constantine II of Greece and, patrilineally, Charles III of the United Kingdom. His great-great-grandfather, Friedrich, Duke of Schleswig-Holstein-Sonderburg-Glücksburg, was the older brother of Christian IX of Denmark, and through him Christoph is heir by male primogeniture to the Danish title Duke of Glücksburg conferred by the Danish crown in 1825. Christoph is also, cognatically, a descendant of Queen Victoria and Alexander II of Russia.

Life
Christoph was born in Louisenlund Castle in Güby, near Eckernförde, Schleswig-Holstein, West Germany, the eldest son of Peter, Duke of Schleswig-Holstein (1922–1980), and his wife Princess Marie Alix of Schaumburg-Lippe (1923-2021). He has a diploma in Agricultural Engineering. Christoph served as a Reservist in the German Army for two years holding the rank of lieutenant.

He succeeded to the headship of the ducal house on 30 September 1980 following the death of his father. While possession of the united duchies of Schleswig and Holstein had been allocated by a series of wars and treaties since the First Schleswig War of 1848 and the London Protocol of 1852, the ducal title was borne by Christoph's father and paternal grandfather (as inherited from his great-grandfather, Friedrich Ferdinand, Duke of Schleswig-Holstein-Sonderburg-Glücksburg in 1934). However Christoph is known also by the title which is shared by male cadets of the dynasty, "Prince of Schleswig-Holstein-Sonderburg-Glücksburg".

Since 1980, Christoph chairs the board of the family foundation that owns the ancestral castle, Glücksburg Castle. He is a founding member of the GLC Glücksburg Consulting Group and serves as chairman of its advisory board. He resides in Grünholz near Schwansen where he has business interests in agriculture, forestry and real estate. He is the owner of the Grünholz and Bienebek estates and is one of the largest landowners of Schleswig-Holstein. His sister, Princess Ingeborg, chairs the board of a further family foundation, the Stiftung Louisenlund.

Family
Christoph married Princess Elisabeth of Lippe-Weissenfeld (born 28 July 1957 in Munich), daughter of Prince Alfred Karl Friedrich Georg Franz of Lippe-Weissenfeld (b. 1922) and wife Baroness Irmgard Julinka Wagner von Wehrborn (b. 1928), at Glücksburg civilly on 23 September 1981 and religiously on 3 October.

Christoph and Elisabeth have four children:

Princess Sophie of Schleswig-Holstein (born 9 October 1983 in Eckernförde), she married Swedish entrepreneur Anders Wahlquist (born 1968) in 2015. They have two children.
Friedrich Ferdinand, Hereditary Prince of Schleswig-Holstein (born 19 July 1985 in Eckernförde), he married German model Anjuta Buchholz in March 2017.
Prince Constantin of Schleswig-Holstein (born 14 July 1986 in Eckernförde), engaged in December 2022 to Countess Marie Sophia Franziska Marlen von der Schulenburg (born 17 April 1990 in Valencia, Spain)
Prince Leopold of Schleswig-Holstein (born 5 September 1991 in Eckernförde)

Ancestry

References

External links

Schloss Glücksburg
The Prince of Schleswig-Holstein's company website

1949 births
Living people
20th-century German people
21st-century German people
20th-century German military personnel
Princes of Schleswig-Holstein-Sonderburg-Glücksburg
People from Schleswig, Schleswig-Holstein
People from Eckernförde